Orly is a Parisian suburb.

Orly may also refer to:

Other places in France
 Orly Airport, Orly, Paris
Orly Air Base, coterminous American airfield (1918–1967)
 Orly-sur-Morin, Seine-et-Marne
 Capitale & Victor ORLY Gallery, an art gallery in Marseille

Businesses
 O'Reilly Auto Parts (NASDAQ symbol: ORLY)
 O'Reilly Media, tech publisher (parodied as O RLY)

Music
 "Orly", a 1973 single by The Guess Who from their album, Artificial Paradise
 "Orly", a Jacques Brel song from his 1977 album, Les Marquises
 "Samba de Orly", a Chico Buarque song from his 1971 album, Construção

People
 Orly (name), a given name, and a list of people with the name
 Victor Orly (born Guennadi Grebniov), French-Ukrainian contemporary painter

Other uses
 Orly (film), a 2010 film
 O RLY?, Internet shorthand for "Oh, really?"

See also
 Orły (disambiguation)